Fábio Pereira de Oliveira (born 30 September 1981 in Manaus), more commonly known as Fábio Bala, is a professional Brazilian footballer.

Honours

Club
Fluminense
Campeonato Carioca 2002
Grêmio
Campeonato Brasileiro Série B 2005

Individual
Fluminense
Campeonato Carioca 2003 Top Goalscorer (10 goals)

External links
CBF - BID 

Brazilian footballers
Expatriate footballers in Iran
Brazilian expatriate footballers
Fluminense FC players
Grêmio Foot-Ball Porto Alegrense players
Goiás Esporte Clube players
1981 births
Living people
Association football forwards
People from Manaus
Sportspeople from Amazonas (Brazilian state)